Arlington Hotel is a historic hotel located at Narrowsburg in Sullivan County, New York. It was added to the National Register of Historic Places on March 31, 1983.

History and features

The Arlington Hotel was built in 1894. It was initially operated by J.G. Gutheil.

During the 1890s, the hotel accommodated adventurers and explorers including J. Wallace Hoff of Delaware who later spoke highly of the hospitality and attractive waitresses.

During the 1920s, businessman George Oellrich bought the hotel for use as a general store.

The hotel is a four-story frame structure, five bays wide and three bays deep. The upper three stories are covered in clapboard and the first floor in modern wood siding and permastone. It features a second story porch that spans the south facade.

Delaware Valley Arts Alliance
The building now serves as the Delaware Valley Arts Alliance. The DVAA offers two art galleries, a gift shop, performing arts and cultural programs, in addition to serving as the Arts Council for Sullivan County and providing grant funds for arts nonprofits and individual artists.

References

External links

 Delaware Valley Arts Alliance
 National Register of Historic Places

Hotel buildings on the National Register of Historic Places in New York (state)
Hotel buildings completed in 1894
Buildings and structures in Sullivan County, New York
Tourist attractions in Sullivan County, New York
Arts centers in New York (state)
National Register of Historic Places in Sullivan County, New York